John Edward "Ed" Broadbent  (born March 21, 1936) is a Canadian social-democratic politician, political scientist, and chair of the Broadbent Institute, a policy thinktank. He was leader of the New Democratic Party from 1975 to 1989. In the 2004 federal election, he returned to Parliament for an additional term as the Member of Parliament for Ottawa Centre.

Early life and career
Broadbent was born in Oshawa, Ontario, the son of Percy, who worked at General Motors, and Mary (Welsh) Broadbent, a homemaker.

In 1961, he married Yvonne Yamaoka, a Japanese-Canadian town planner whose family had been interned by the federal government in World War II. They divorced in 1967. On September 22, 1988, when Brian Mulroney's government apologized for the internment, Broadbent brought up Yamaoka's experiences during his remarks in the House of Commons.

In 1971, he married a young Franco-Ontarian widow, Lucille Munroe.  Munroe died of cancer on November 17, 2006, at the age of 71.

Broadbent married the Marxist historian and political theorist Ellen Meiksins Wood, an old friend, in 2014. She died in 2016, at the age of 73.

Broadbent received a Doctor of Philosophy (PhD) degree in political science from the University of Toronto in 1966, with a thesis titled "The Good Society of John Stuart Mill". He is currently a fellow in the School of Policy Studies at Queen's University, Canada.

Political career
Broadbent was a university professor when he won an election to the Canadian House of Commons in the riding of Oshawa—Whitby during the 1968 general election. He defeated a former Progressive Conservative cabinet minister, Michael Starr, by 15 votes. Broadbent ran for the leadership of the party but lost to David Lewis at the 1971 leadership convention. He won the 1975 leadership election to succeed Lewis and led the party through four elections.

Leader of the NDP (1975–1989)

In his early years as leader of the party, Broadbent was criticized for his long and complex speeches on industrial organization, but he came to be known as an honest and charismatic politician in person. He was one of the first Canadian politicians to stage a large number of political events in the workplace.

1979 and 1980 elections 

In the 1979 federal election, the NDP under Broadbent boosted their seat count from 17 to 26 seats. In the 1980 election nine months later, Broadbent's NDP again experienced a boost of support from 27 to 32 seats.

1984 election

The NDP finished with 30 seats in the 1984 federal election, just ten behind the Liberal Party of Canada, led by John Turner. Several polls later showed that Broadbent was the most popular party leader in Canada. Broadbent was the first leader who ever took the NDP to first place in public opinion polling, and some pundits felt that the NDP could supplant Turner's Liberals as the primary opposition to the Progressive Conservative Party of Canada of Brian Mulroney.

1988 election

Nonetheless, Broadbent was not successful in translating this into an election victory in the 1988 federal election since the Liberals reaped most of the benefits from opposing the Canada-United States Free Trade Agreement. However, the NDP won 43 seats, a record unchallenged until the 2011 federal election, when the NDP won 103 seats and Jack Layton became the leader of the opposition.

On the international front, Willy Brandt was president of the Socialist International, and Broadbent served as a vice-president from 1979 to 1989.

Broadbent stepped down after 14 and a half years as leader of the federal NDP at the 1989 Winnipeg Convention, when he was succeeded by Audrey McLaughlin.

Later life

In the decade following Broadbent's retirement from politics, the federal NDP declined in popularity. The party would not come close to the popularity that it had enjoyed under Broadbent until Jack Layton took over the leadership in 2003.

Broadbent was director of the International Centre for Human Rights and Democratic Development from 1990 to 1996. In 1993, he was made an Officer of the Order of Canada and was promoted to Companion in 2001.

Broadbent spent a year as Fellow at All Souls College, University of Oxford, in 1996–1997.

At Layton's invitation, he returned to politics in 2004. With the aid of a humorous and popular video clip, he successfully ran for Parliament in the riding of Ottawa Centre, where he now lives. He defeated the Liberal candidate Richard Mahoney, a close ally of Canadian Prime Minister Paul Martin.

In the NDP shadow cabinet, Broadbent was Critic for Democracy: Parliamentary & Electoral Reform, Corporate Accountability as well as Child Poverty.

On May 4, 2005, he announced that he would not seek re-election in the 2006 federal election so that he could spend time with his wife, Lucille, who was suffering from cancer. She died on November 17, 2006.

Broadbent's third wife, Ellen Meiksins Wood, whom he married in 2014, died of cancer at the couple's Ottawa home at 73 in January, 2016. She was a noted political theorist and socialist historian, author of a number of books and a professor at York University for three decades.

In November 2008, Broadbent and former Prime Minister Jean Chrétien came out of retirement to help to negotiate a formal coalition agreement between the Liberals and the New Democratic Party, which would be supported by the Bloc Québécois. The coalition was formed in a bid to replace the Conservative government of Prime Minister Stephen Harper and would have been the first in Canada since World War I. However, the coalition talks died down after Governor General Michaëlle Jean prorogued parliament in December 2008 at Harper's request.

Broadbent has voiced his support for the Campaign for the establishment of a United Nations Parliamentary Assembly, an organization that advocates for democratic reform in the United Nations, and the creation of a more accountable international political system.

On June 17, 2011, he announced the creation of the Broadbent Institute to explore social-democratic policy and ideas. It provides a vehicle for social-democratic and progressive academics, provides education, and trains activists. It is independent of the New Democratic Party.

On September 12, 2011, he endorsed Brian Topp in his unsuccessful campaign during the 2012 leadership election.

Archives 
There is an Ed Broadbent fonds at Library and Archives Canada. Archival reference number is R5828.

References

External links
 How'd They Vote?: Ed Broadbent's voting history and quotes
 
 

1936 births
Canadian aviators
Canadian political scientists
Canadian people of Irish descent
Companions of the Order of Canada
Living people
Members of the House of Commons of Canada from Ontario
Members of the King's Privy Council for Canada
NDP and CCF leaders
New Democratic Party MPs
People from Oshawa
Politicians from Ottawa
Academic staff of the Queen's University at Kingston
Royal Canadian Air Force personnel
Trinity College (Canada) alumni
University of Toronto alumni
21st-century Canadian legislators
20th-century Canadian legislators